Zofia Bilorówna (or Zofia Bilor) (June 16, 1895 in Lwów – June 23, 1962 in Rzeszów)  was a Polish figure skater who competed in pair skating.

With partner Tadeusz Kowalski, she won bronze at the 1934 European Figure Skating Championships.

Their parents were Tomasz and Zofia.

Competitive highlights 
With  Tadeusz Kowalski:

References 

1895 births
1962 deaths
Sportspeople from Lviv
People from the Kingdom of Galicia and Lodomeria
Polish female pair skaters
European Figure Skating Championships medalists